Kepa Junkera Urraza (born 1965 in Bilbao, Euskadi, Spain) is a Basque musician and composer.  A master of the trikitixa, the diatonic accordion, he has recorded more than 10 albums.  Junkera won the Latin Grammy Award for Best Folk Album in 2004 for his album K.

Discography
Albums
Infernuko Auspoa - Kepa, Zabaleta eta Motriku (1986)
Triki Up - Kepa, Zabaleta eta Imanol (1990)
Trikitixa Zoom (1991)
Trans-Europe Diatonique - Kepa Junkera, John Kirkpatrick and Riccardo Tesi (1993)
Kalejira Al-buk (1994)
Lau Eskutara - Kepa Junkera and Julio Pereira (1995)
Leonen Orroak - Kepa Junkera and Ibon Koteron (1996)
Bilbao 00:00h (1998) Alula Records
Tricky! (2000)
Maren (2001)
K (2003)
Athletic Bihotzez (2004)
Hiri (2006)
Etxea (2008)
Fandango - Provença Sessions (2009)
Kalea (2009)
Fandango - Habana Sessions (2010)
Beti Bizi (2010)
Herria (2010)
Ultramarinos & Coloniales (2011)
Ipar Haizea Kepa Junkera with the Orquesta Sinfónica de Euskadi (2011)
Galiza (2013)
”Kepa Junkera & Sorginak – Trikitixaren historia txiki bat/Una pequeña historia de la trikitixa (2014)
Kepa Junkera & Sorginak – Maletak (2016)
Kepa Junkera - Fok (2017)

References

External links
Official website

1965 births
Living people
Basque musicians
Spanish accordionists
Latin Grammy Award winners
People from Bilbao